Peravurani taluk is a taluk in the Thanjavur district of Tamil Nadu, India. The headquarters is the town of Peravurani.

Demographics
According to the 2011 census, the taluk of Peravurani had a population of 123,792 with 60,295  males and 63,497 females. There were 1053 women for every 1000 men. The taluk had a literacy rate of 71.21. Child population in the age group below 6 was 5,847 Males and 5,709 Females.

Villages
The following is an incomplete list of villages in the Peravurani taluk:

 Avanam
 Sethbavachathiriram
 Thuraiyur
 Pinnavasal
 Nattanikkottai
 Serubalakkadu
 Ammaiyandi
 Udayanadu
 Thennangudi
 Thirupooranikkadu
 Nadakadu
 Nadankadu
 Kalathur
 Korattur
 Mudachikkadu
 Mudukadu
 Munumakadu
 Nadiyam
 Senthalai vayal
 Vembangudi-Paingal
 Kalanikkottai
 Veerayankottai
 Kuruvikkarambai
 Solaganarvayal
 Kalanivasal
 KR puram
 kalaingar Nagar, Samathuvapuram
 Vathalaikkadu
 Kaivinivayal
 Valapiramankadu
 Kalagam
 Pookkollai
 Perumagalur
 Irattai Vayal
 Vilangulam
 Solaikaadu
 Kolakkudi

References

External links
 

Taluks of Thanjavur district